Mount Zion Presbyterian Church is a historic church in Chandlersville, Ohio.

It was built in 1864 and added to the National Register of Historic Places in 1978.

References

Presbyterian churches in Ohio
Churches on the National Register of Historic Places in Ohio
Churches completed in 1864
Churches in Muskingum County, Ohio
National Register of Historic Places in Muskingum County, Ohio